Okrąglik may refer to the following places:
Okrąglik, Masovian Voivodeship (east-central Poland)
Okrąglik, Silesian Voivodeship (south Poland)
Okrąglik, Lubliniec County in Silesian Voivodeship (south Poland)